Alejandro Gabriel Meloño Botta (born April 27, 1977) is a former football player from Uruguay who played as a centre back.

Meloño is a left sided central defender. He started his career in 1997 with Rentistas in Uruguay.  In 1998, he moved to Argentina where he played for San Lorenzo, Nueva Chicago and Almagro.  In 2000, he came to Europe for the first time and played for Real Murcia in Spain before returning to Argentina a year later in 2001 to play for Almagro again.  In 2004, he joined Rosario Central and in 2005 he moved to Chacarita Juniors.  He returned to Europe later in 2005 where he joined Yeovil Town on a short-term contract before signing for Deportivo Quito of Ecuador. He spent 2006 at minor Argentinian club La Plata FC and the spring of 2007 at Ben Hur before returning to Almagro for a third spell.

He has also played for the Uruguayan Under 20 and Under 23 national teams.

References

Alejandro Meloño at playmakerstats.com (English version of ceroacero.es)

1977 births
Living people
Footballers from Montevideo
Uruguayan footballers
Uruguay under-20 international footballers
Uruguay international footballers
Uruguayan expatriate footballers
Uruguayan expatriate sportspeople in Spain
Uruguayan expatriate sportspeople in England
C.A. Rentistas players
San Lorenzo de Almagro footballers
Nueva Chicago footballers
Rosario Central footballers
Chacarita Juniors footballers
La Plata FC footballers
Club Almagro players
La Liga players
Real Murcia players
Yeovil Town F.C. players
S.D. Quito footballers
Expatriate footballers in Spain
Expatriate footballers in England
Expatriate footballers in Ecuador
Expatriate footballers in Argentina
Association football defenders